The 1972 Merdeka Tournament was held from 12 July to 29 July 1972 in Malaysia.  Twelve teams from 11 nations participated.

Group stage

Group A

Group B

Eleventh place

Ninth place

Seventh place

Fifth place

Knockout stage

Semi-finals

Third place

Final

References 
Morrison, Neil; Jovanovic, Bojan. "Merdeka Tournament 1972 (Malaysia)". RSSSF.com

Merd
Merdeka Tournament, 1972
Merdeka Cup
Mer